"Black Velveteen" is the sixth and last single to be released from the 5 album by American rock musician Lenny Kravitz. It was released on November 29, 1999. The song was also used to promote his Greatest Hits album.

Composition
Lenny Kravitz on the inspiration for "Black Velveteen" in an interview from 2000:

Musically, the song, apart from having an electro-rock influence, features notable sound effects that can be associated with everyday machines, such as the vacuum cleaner and drill.

Single track listing

UK CD single edition

 "Black Velveteen" (Album Version)– 4:49
 "American Woman" (Timbaland Remix)– 3:49
 "Black Velveteen" (S-Man's Ghost In The Machine Mix)– 7:11
Note: This release also contains the uncensored version of the music video for the song.

UE CD single edition

 "Black Velveteen" (Edit)– 3:31
 "Live" (Live Version)– 6:19
 "Supersoulfighter"– 7:08
 "Fly Away" (Reggae Version)– 5:06

 12" edition

 "Black Velveteen" (S-Man's Ghost In The Machine Mix)– 7:10
 "Black Velveteen" (S-Man's Ghost In The Machine Dub)– 5:58
 "Black Velveteen" (S-Man's Ghost In The Machine Instrumental)– 5:55
 "Black Velveteen" (Stonebridge EXFM Mix)– 4:57
 "Black Velveteen" (Stonebridge Club Dub)– 6:21
 "Black Velveteen" (RPO Ready To Please Mix)– 6:16
 "Black Velveteen" (RPO Titanium Spin Dub Mix)– 5:41

References

Lenny Kravitz songs
1999 singles
Song recordings produced by Lenny Kravitz
Songs written by Lenny Kravitz
Music videos directed by Samuel Bayer
1998 songs
Virgin Records singles